Conrads is a surname. Notable people with the name include:

 Carl Conrads (1839–1920), American sculptor
 Heinz Conrads (1913–1986), Austrian actor
 Randy Conrads, founder of Classmates.com

See also
 Konrads (disambiguation), includes a list of people with the name Konrads 
 Conrad (name), given name and surname